Neil Logan (16 December 1875 – 1949) was a Scottish footballer who played in the Football League for Blackburn Rovers and Sheffield United.

References

1875 births
1949 deaths
Scottish footballers
English Football League players
Association football defenders
Rutherglen Glencairn F.C. players
Sheffield United F.C. players
Swindon Town F.C. players
Blackburn Rovers F.C. players